Katia Skanavi (born in Moscow, 1971) is a Russian pianist. Granddaughter of the Russian film director Aleksandr Zarkhi.

Skanavi started a concert career after being awarded the XXII Long-Thibaud Competition's 3rd prize at 18. In 1994 she won Athens' Maria Callas Grand Prize. In 1995, she received an honorable mention at the XIII International Chopin Piano Competition.

References
 Profile at the Fryderyk Chopin Information Centre

Russian classical pianists
Russian women pianists
1971 births
Living people
Long-Thibaud-Crespin Competition prize-winners
Prize-winners of the International Chopin Piano Competition
Russian people of Greek descent
Russian people of Jewish descent
Women classical pianists
21st-century women pianists